This is a list of episodes of the British television medical drama series The Royal.

When the episodes are aired or repeated abroad some musical tracks have been replaced from the original UK broadcast episode/s. This is due to either copyright issues or clearance issues from the various record companies.

87 episodes of The Royal have aired.

Series overview

Episodes

Series 1 (2003)

Series 2 (2003)

Series 3 (2003–04)

Series 4 (2004–05)

Series 5 (2006)

Series 6 (2007)

Series 7 (2008–09)

Series 8 (2009–11)

References

External links
 

Royal, The